Chalcosyrphus elegans is a species of Hoverfly in the family Syrphidae.

Distribution
Myanmar.

References

Eristalinae
Insects described in 1985
Insects of Myanmar
Diptera of Asia